Bắc Kạn, also spelt Bắc Cạn, is a province of Vietnam. It is located in the Northeast region, due north of the capital Hanoi. Bắc Kạn is the only town of the province which is the capital of the province and is a municipality. The province covers an area of 4,859.4 square kilometres and as of 2019 it had a population of 313,905 people. It is a  mountainous terrain with rich natural resources of minerals and forests. It has numerous mountains, rivers and lakes which are very scenic. Ba Bể National Park and Ba Bể Lake lie within its borders.

Etymology
The name Bắc Kạn is derived from the Sino-Vietnamese Bac, meaning north, and the native Vietnamese Kạn, meaning arid; Bac Kạn is rendered in Hán-Nôm as (氵+件).

The province is in the northeast midland mountainous area of Vietnam. Its terrain has the highest altitude among the 11 provinces of the region. Forest area dominates more than 95% of the province. The remainder is available for agricultural and other uses. Due to this rugged and forested topography, development of water resources has been limited resulting in exploitation of its forest resources; this has caused degradation of the forests.

There are numerous rivers and streams flowing through the province, each with small catchment areas. However, most of them have steep slopes and short lengths.

Out of the total population, 83% are dependent on agriculture. 

Climate
The climatic condition of the province is typically tropical monsoonal, which exhibits two distinct seasons — the rainy season from May to October accounting for about 88-90% of the annual rainfall and dry climatic conditions between November and April. This results in water shortage conditions during the dry months.

Demographics
It is the least populated province in Vietnam. The male population during this period was 160,036 while the female population was 153,869. The rural population was 248,773 against an urban population of 65,132 (about 26% of the rural population). The main ethnic groups in the province in decreasing number, are ethnic Kinh, Tày, Nùng and Dao.

Administrative divisions
Bắc Kạn is subdivided into 8 district-level sub-divisions:

 7 districts:

 Ba Bể
 Bạch Thông
 Chợ Đồn
 Chợ Mới
 Na Rì
 Ngân Sơn
 Pác Nặm

 1 district-level town:
 Bắc Kạn (capital)

They are further subdivided into 6 commune-level towns (or townlets), 112 communes, and 4 wards.

Table of local government divisions

Economy

Bắc Kạn's economy is centred on mining, forest products, agriculture and some degree of tourism offered by its mountains, lakes and the national park. Some statistics related to the economy of the province are the following.

In 2008, there were only 10 farms as against the national number of 120,699 farms.

The province's agricultural output produce in 2008, at constant 1994 prices, was worth 406.3 billion đồngs against the national value of 156,681.9 billion đồngs.

The province produced 151,800 tonnes of cereals as against the national production of 43.68 million tonnes, in 2008.

The per capita production of cereals in the district was 491.4 kg as against the national figure of 501.8 kg, in 2007.

In 2007, the industrial output of the province was a meagre 376.5 billion đồngs against the national output of 1.47 million billion đồngs.

Water resources development
The limited water resources development in the province is managed by the communes through better water management practices (government supported initiatives) such as water users associations both for domestic water use and agricultural operations. The irrigation systems developed, though often of temporary nature, in many communes. The participatory management practices adopted since the 1990s has resulted in a greater realization by the farmers that they can play a positive role in the development of irrigation systems in their region for their own benefit. This system has ensured more efficient water delivery to the fields and is reported to have increased the cropping area by 15% and yield levels by 20%. This has resulted in improved economic and living conditions for the farmers.

Attractions
The province generates tourism, with the mountains, rivers, and lakes of Bắc Kạn being considered quite scenic, especially Ba Bể Lake (part of Ba Bể National Park).

Ba Bể lake

The bed of the lake is uneven with submerged mounts and also limestone islets. The details of the lake have been submitted for UNESCO recognition under the Criteria: (viii)(ix), Category: Natural Submitted by the  Ministry of Culture and Information - Government of Vietnam. It is the biggest natural lake in Vietnam, formed in the Chợ Rã-Ba Bể-Chợ Đồn karstic or "Karst" low-lying terrain in the northern midlands. Its formation is attributed to the raising mass formation “from the destruction of South East Asia continental mass at the end of Cambrian era, around 200 million years ago”. As opposed to similar karstic lakes in the world, it retains its full storage all through the year. The Government of Vietnam has also notified the lake as a forest preserve and a techno-economic study was instituted as part of the National Park Conservation programme.

The lake and its environs have rich biodiversity of flora and fauna. Among the flora recorded are 417 species of trees, several species of orchids and species of medicinal plants; 179 species of phytoplankton belonging to Chlorophyta, Cyanophyta, Bacillariophyta, Euglenophyta, Pyrrophyta and Chrysophyta have been observed in the lake as well. The faunal species recorded are of terrestrial, aquatic and flying varieties. These are 319 species of animals, out which 42 species are recorded in Vietnam’s Red Book with 3 endemic animal species; the endemic species are the gibbon (snub nose), bamboo-thread and red algae. 106 species of fish recorded in the lake consist of 61 genera, 17 families and 5 orders. 

The three lakes, also called the Slam Pe in the local Tày ethnic language, that form Ba Bể lake are called the Pé Lầm, Pé Lù, and Pé Lèng; all linked as one waterbody. The lake’s central part is contracted while its outer two parts are wider. The lake's hilly catchment drains 3 rivers into the lake, namely, the Tả Han, Nam Cường and Chợ Lèng rivers from south and west and is drained by the Năng River flowing to the north. The lake water is very clear with blue colour, and it is a flowing lake with a velocity maintained by controls at /s. The lake acts as a flood absorption reservoir during the high flow stages of the Năng River when reverse flow occurs from the river into the lake, preventing flooding in the Năng, Gâm and Lô river deltas. The Năng River flows southwards, eventually joining the Lô River in southern Tuyên Quang province, before debouching in the Red River west of Hanoi.

Ba Bể National Park

It was set up to protect the Ba Bể Lake along with its surrounding limestone and lowland evergreen forests. The South-West valley of Phiabyior Range of the park has mountain peaks with an elevation range of 517–1,525 m. The reserve forest has two main types of forest vegetation namely the limestone and lowland evergreen forests. The limestone forest, the larger of the two types in the reserve has steep limestone slopes with shallow soil cover. The forest species recorded are mostly Burretiodendron hsienmu and Streblus tonkinensis. The other type is the lowland evergreen forest shallow slopes with a thicker mantle of soils. It has a rich ground flora with a higher diversity of tree species.

There are 65 mammal species in the park. The prominent ones are Owston's civet (Chrotogale owstoni; globally vulnerable), Francois' leaf monkey (Trachypithecus francoisi) and Tonkin snub-nosed monkey (Rhinopithecus avunculus; globally critically endangered). The other species include Chinese pangolin (Manis pentadactyla), slow loris (Nycticebus coucang), rhesus macaque, stump-tailed macaque, François' langur, Asian black bear, European otter, Asian golden cat, mainland serow, red giant flying squirrel, particolored flying squirrel (Hylopetes alboniger), hairy-footed flying squirrel as well as 27 bat species.

About 330 species of butterfly have been recorded, of which 22 are said to be new.
Facilities at the park include an information centre, guest houses, a lake management station, and an ecological research station opened in 2004. The park has 13 villages inhabited by five ethnic groups comprising more than 3,000 people, of which the Tày are the oldest ethnic group (over 2,000 years) and form the majority. The other ethnic groups are Dao, Mong, Nùng and Kinh in descending order by population.

Other attractions in the park

Puông Cave is a large cave in the north of Ba Bể Park through which the Năng River flows. The cave is inhabited by a large population of bats which belong to 18 species, out of which three species are identified for plant pollination and scattering seeds.

The "Fairy Pond" is an isolated rock basin filled with clear water that seeps through the surrounding limestone rock. However, the water level in this pond is the same as the Ba Bể Lake. The Dau Dang Waterfall is formed by the Năng River. It consist of a sequence of rapids which stretch over a length of almost  as the river flows into Tuyên Quang province.

Widow Island is a small, cone-shaped islet near the centre of the southern part of the lake. According to local legend, the islet was once the home of an old widow who was spared from a flood through divine intervention. Other well known caves include Puông Cave, Nả Poỏng, Ba Cửa Cave, Sơn Dương Cave and the Kim Hỷ nature reserve.

References

External links
Bắc Kạn province official website 

 
Northeast (Vietnam)
Provinces of Vietnam